Jorge Luis González (born October 19, 1964) (DOB disputed) is a former heavyweight boxing contender and prospect born in Havana, Cuba. He won the gold medal at the 1983 Pan American Games and the 1987 Pan American Games and the former WBO Latino Heavyweight Champion. On June 17, 1995, the big puncher Gonzalez became the first Cuban boxer to challenge for a heavyweight world title when he fought WBO champion Riddick Bowe at MGM Grand Garden Arena in Las Vegas.

Amateur
González compiled an Amateur Record of 22013.  His highlights include:
Super Heavyweight Gold Medalist at the 1983 Pan-American Games in Caracas, Venezuela.
Super Heavyweight Gold Medalist at the 1987 Pan-American Games in Indianapolis, United States. His results were:
Defeated Riddick Bowe (United States) 3:2
Defeated Lennox Lewis (Canada) 4:1
Lost to Lennox Lewis at the 1987 North American Championships in Toronto, Canada, by decision.

After an outstanding amateur career in Cuba, where he defeated the likes of Teofilo Stevenson, Tyrell Biggs, and Craig Payne, he defected during a Cuban Team event in Finland, in 1991.

Pro
He reached the US and turned professional in Miami in June 1991. His progress as a professional was severely hindered by González's refusal to co-operate with trainers or training, feeling as a top Cuban amateur there was nothing he could be taught. He went through several different trainers during his first few years as a pro.

At 6'7, he towered over his opposition, and the majority of his fights featured the huge Gonzalez crudely clubbing his victims to defeat. Although he was criticised for not fighting anyone of note, at the time he was a genuinely feared contender and top-class opponents were reticent to fight him.

His most notable results in accumulating a 23-0 (22 KO's) record were his 10-round beating and TKO of the faded but still very game and tough Renaldo Snipes, a first-round KO of a faded Phil Brown, and a one punch, two-round KO of Mike Evans, a tough fringe contender that nobody had been able to stop in ten years.

In June 1995, after a heated build up, he fought hated arch rival  Riddick Bowe in Las Vegas, for the WBO Heavyweight championship. Bowe exposed González for his limitations and lack of development, savagely pounding the Cuban before knocking him clean out in the 6th round.

In 1996 González returned, seemingly out of shape, for a high-profile fight with ex-champ Tim Witherspoon in New York. Gonzalez blew his chance of redemption, as Witherspoon used his  superior skills and big power to take González apart, decking him twice and knocking him out in five rounds, issuing an even more complete defeat than Bowe had done.

Later that year González quit midway through a fight with trial horse Ross Puritty, ending his term as a contender.

In 1997 hot prospect and equally giant Michael Grant blew him away in one round, although in 1999 a new and improved González resurfaced, in-shape and more polished, bombing out Alex Stewart in two rounds and outpointing ex-champ Greg Page over ten.

A Mike Tyson fight failed to materialise as Tyson-lookalike  Cliff Couser demolished the Cuban in three rounds in 2000. In 2001 González lost to Joe Mesi in four, and his career was effectively dead in 2002 when last minute sub Derek Bryant walked over him in one round.

His only title was the WBO Latino Heavyweight title in which he defeated Daniel Eduardo Neto by Points decision.

Professional boxing record

References

External links

 

Heavyweight boxers
Super-heavyweight boxers
1964 births
Living people
Boxers from Havana
Boxers at the 1983 Pan American Games
Boxers at the 1987 Pan American Games
Pan American Games gold medalists for Cuba
Cuban male boxers
Defecting sportspeople of Cuba
Pan American Games medalists in boxing
Competitors at the 1986 Central American and Caribbean Games
Central American and Caribbean Games gold medalists for Cuba
Central American and Caribbean Games medalists in boxing
Medalists at the 1983 Pan American Games
Medalists at the 1987 Pan American Games